Toraman is a village in Ulukışla ilçe (district) of Niğde Province, Turkey.  Toraman has been identified as the site of ancient Faustinopolis.

Villages in Niğde Province